Juan Pablo Ficovich (born 24 January 1997) is an Argentine professional tennis player.

Ficovich has a career high ATP singles ranking of World No. 125 achieved on 25 July 2022. He also has a career high ATP doubles ranking of World No. 364 achieved on 25 April 2022.

Career

2020-2021: ATP and Top 200 debut, First Challenger title
Ficovich made his ATP main draw debut at the 2020 Córdoba Open after qualifying for the singles main draw, defeating Pedro Sousa and Filip Horanský, but losing with Gianluca Mager in the first round. A few weeks later, Juan Pablo reached the Challenger final at the 2020 Morelos Open, the second of his career, where he lost in three sets to Jurij Rodionov.

He won his first singles ATP challenger title at the 2021 São Paulo Challenger de Tênis.

2022: First ATP win
In Córdoba, he defeated compatriot Federico Coria in the first round for his first ATP main draw match win.

Future and Challenger finals

Singles: 18 (11–7)

References

External links
 
 

1997 births
Living people
Argentine male tennis players
Tennis players from Buenos Aires
20th-century Argentine people
21st-century Argentine people